The Executive Yuan is the executive branch of the government of the Republic of China (Taiwan). Its leader is premier, who is appointed by president of the Republic of China.

Under the amended constitution, the head of the Executive Yuan is the Premier who is positioned as the head of government and has the power to appoint members to serve in the cabinet, while the ROC President is the head of state under the semi-presidential system, who can appoint the Premier and nominate the members of the cabinet. The Premier may be removed by a vote of no-confidence by a majority of the Legislative Yuan, after which the President may either remove the Premier or dissolve the Legislative Yuan and initiate a new election for legislators.

Organization and structure 

The Executive Yuan is headed by the Premier (or President of the Executive Yuan) and includes its Vice Premier, twelve cabinet ministers, various chairpersons of commissions, and five to nine ministers without portfolio. The Vice Premier, ministers and chairpersons are appointed by the President of the Republic of China on the recommendation of the Premier.

Its formation, as one of five branches ("Yuans") of the government, stemmed from the Three Principles of the People, the constitutional theory of Sun Yat-sen, but was adjusted constitutionally over the years to adapt to the situation in the ROC by changes in the laws and the Constitution of the Republic of China.

Ministries

Councils and commissions 
Empowered by various laws or the Constitution, under the Executive Yuan Council several individual boards are formed to enforce different executive functions of the government. Unless regulated otherwise, the chairs are appointed by and answer to the Premier. The members of the boards are usually (a) governmental officials for the purpose of interdepartmental coordination and cooperation; or (b) creditable professionals for their reputation and independence.

Independent commissions 
There are independent executive commissions under the Executive Yuan Council. Members of these commissions have to be confirmed by the Legislative Yuan.

Other organs

Organizations no longer under Executive Yuan 

Duencies may be dissolved or merged with other agencies. Based on Executive Yuan website, the following bodies are no longer agencies under the Executive Yuan:
 Consumer Protection Commission, restructured as the Consumer Protection Committee on 1 January 2012
 Aviation Safety Council, became an independent agency on 20 May 2012, later renamed Taiwan Transportation Safety Board
 National Disaster Prevention and Protection Commission: a task-force-grouped committee authorized by the law of Disaster Prevention and Protection.

Dissolved or cease to function 
 Government Information Office on 20 May 2012
 Council for Economic Planning and Development on 21 January 2014
 Research, Development and Evaluation Commission on 21 January 2014
 Mongolian and Tibetan Affairs Commission on 15 September 2017

Ministers without portfolio 
In the Executive Yuan Council, the current ministers without portfolio are:

 Chang Ching-sen
 Huang Chih-ta
 John Deng
 Kung Ming-hsin, also serving as Minister of National Development Council
 Lee Yung-te
 Lin Wan-i
 Lo Ping-cheng (羅秉成), also serving as spokesperson of the Yuan
 Wu Tsung-tsong, also serving as Minister of National Science and Technology Council 
 Wu Tze-cheng, also serving as Minister of Public Construction Commission

Executive Yuan Council 
The Executive Yuan Council, commonly referred to as "The Cabinet", is the chief policymaking organ of the ROC government. It consists of the premier, who presides over its meetings, the vice premier, ministers without portfolio, the heads of the ministries, and the heads of the Mongolian and Tibetan Affairs Commission and the Overseas Chinese Affairs Commission. The secretary-general and the deputy secretary-general of the Executive Yuan also attend, as well as heads of other Executive Yuan organizations by invitation, but they have no vote. Article 58 of the Constitution empowers the Executive Yuan Council to evaluate statutory and budgetary bills concerning martial law, amnesty, declarations of war, conclusion of peace or treaties, and other important affairs before submission to the Legislative Yuan.

Relationship with the Legislative Yuan 
The Executive Yuan Council must present the Legislators with an annual policy statement and an administrative report. The Legislative Committee may also summon members of the Executive Yuan Council for questioning.

Whenever there is disagreement between the Legislative Council and Executive Yuan Council, the Legislative Committee may pass a resolution asking the Executive Yuan Council to alter the policy proposal in question. The Executive Yuan may, in turn, ask the Legislators to reconsider. Afterwards, if the Legislative Council upholds the original resolution, the premier must abide by the resolution or resign. The Executive Yuan Council may also present an alternative budgetary bill if the one passed by the Legislative Committee is deemed difficult to execute.

Access 
The Executive Yuan building is accessible within walking distance east of Taipei Main Station or west of Shandao Temple Station of Taipei Metro.

See also 

 Department of State Affairs in the Three Departments and Six Ministries system
 Ming dynasty: Central Secretariat → Grand Secretariat
 Qing dynasty: Grand Secretariat → Grand Council → Cabinet
 Republic of China: State Council (1912–28); Politics of the Republic of China; Government of the Republic of China
 People's Republic of China: Government Administration Council of the Central People's Government (1949–54) → State Council of the People's Republic of China (1954–present); Ministries of the PRC 
 Government-General of Taiwan (1895–1945)

References

External links 

 

 
Government agencies established in 1928
1928 establishments in China
Taiwan, Executive Yuan
Government of Taiwan